Estadi Montilivi is a multi-use stadium in Girona, Catalonia, Spain. It is used mostly for football matches and serves as the home ground of Girona FC. It was built and opened in 1970.

After their first ever promotion to La Liga, Girona expanded the stadium for hosting 13,450 spectators. Later, its capacity was reduced to 11,810.

History
The side stand of the Montilivi Stadium was completed in June of 2010, seven months ahead of the schedule. Since the entrances were still not finished, the stadium was not open for public use in the 2009–10 season. On March 2, 2011, it was able to hold the first match with the side stands, and 9,285 spectators attended the event.

On March 12, 2012, the Girona City Council ceded the field to Girona FC for 30 years, renewable to 50 in total.

Girona added the Montilivi Stadium to the list of fields as part of the Iberian candidacy for the 2018 World Cup; however, months before the official list of football stadiums that would make up the candidacy was published, Girona FC withdrew the name of Montilivi, understanding that it had little chance of being chosen.

Notable matches

References

External links
Stadium information
Estadios de Espana 

Football venues in Catalonia
Girona FC
1970 establishments in Catalonia
Sports venues completed in 1970